Juhlin is a Swedish surname. Notable people with the surname include:

Patrik Juhlin (born 1970), Swedish ice hockey player
Richard Juhlin (born 1962), Swedish expert on Champagne

See also
Julin (surname)

Swedish-language surnames